Southern Highlands is a master-planned community located in the southern foothills of the Las Vegas Valley, Nevada, United States. The community surrounds the private Southern Highlands Golf Club. It contains a resort, two retail centers, recreational facilities, a country club, spa, multiple parks, two medical centers, a public safety department, and an office plaza.

It is among the most affluent communities in the state of Nevada, with an average household income of $100,207 and an average household net worth of $579,866. Southern Highlands is located within Enterprise, Nevada.

History
In 1996, the Bureau of Land Management (BLM) was negotiating a property swap with the Arizona-based Olympic Group. Olympic Group completed the first phase of the BLM land exchange deal in October 1996, while the second phase was completed on April 26, 1997. The following month, the Clark County Commission gave tentative approval for Olympic Highlands, an 1,850-acre luxury master-planned community with a total of 6,000 to 8,000 homes. The development could also include casinos, offices, retail centers, and an industrial park. Olympic Group hoped to break ground in late 1997. The community would be located south of the Las Vegas Strip at the southern end of the Las Vegas Valley. The property was bordered by Cactus Avenue to the north, Jones Boulevard to the west, Interstate 15 and St. Rose Parkway to the east, and Larson Lane to the south. The community was expected to have a population of approximately 17,500 people.

The project would mark Olympic Group's first large-scale community development. As a requirement before final approval, Olympic Group was requested to submit a financial analysis of the impact that the community would have on public services. The study would examine the effect that Olympic Highlands would have on roads, schools, fire protection, and other public services. Olympic also agreed to spend more than $150 million in public service improvements, which would include donating land for parks and schools, and upgrading the nearby I-15/Lake Mead interchange. Nearby residents were concerned about how the project would affect their horse ranches, mountain views, and night sky clarity. In July 1997, the Clark County Commission declined to hold public hearings on the project until the completion of the fiscal impact statement. By November 1998, the project's name had been changed to Southern Highlands, due to concerns from the U.S. Olympic Committee, which was known for protecting the rights to its name.

The community includes the Southern Highlands Golf Club, which opened in 1999. The community also has its own 24-hour security patrol.

In 2003, construction began on the $30 million, 21-acre Southern Highlands Marketplace. The community's first office space, a three-story building, was under construction in 2004. As of 2005, the community had approximately 7,000 homes, and had been approved for up to 10,400.

In 2005, Olympic Gaming proposed the Southern Highlands hotel-casino resort, to be built adjacent to the community. The $1 billion project was scheduled to begin construction in 2007, and would have included a  shopping mall, the Gallery Southern Highlands. Because of uncertainty in the financial markets, the project was delayed in August 2007, and ultimately cancelled.

The Olympia Sports Park opened in August 2018.

Schools 
 Southern Highlands Preparatory School, a private, university preparatory elementary and middle school that opened in August 2003 with a tuition fee of $15,865 per year.
 Charles and Phyllis Frias Elementary School
 Dennis Ortwein Elementary School
 Evelyn Stuckey Elementary School
 Lois and Jerry Tarkanian Middle School (located outside of Southern Highlands)
 Desert Oasis High School (located outside of Southern Highlands)

Other programs 
 Boys and Girls Club of Southern Nevada

Notable people
Notable residents of Southern Highlands include the following:

 Marc-André Fleury, professional ice hockey goaltender
 Dave Aron, music producer
 DJ Ashba, musician, producer
 Marc Badain, businessman and football executive
 Bobby Baldwin, professional poker player, casino executive
 Toni Braxton, musician
 Tom Cable, professional football coach
 Ben Carey, musician
 Derek Carr, football quarterback
 Chris Carter, professional baseball player
 Nick Carter, musician
 Calvin Collins, professional football player
 Baron Davis, professional basketball player
 Jordan Farmar, professional basketball player
 Terry Fator, ventriloquist 
 Clelin Ferrell, professional football player
 Charles Frias, businessman and philanthropist
 Tyson Fury, professional boxer
 Jon Gruden, former head coach of the Las Vegas Raiders
 Tony Hsieh, businessman
 Reggie Jackson, professional baseball player
 Penn Jillette, magician
 Hubert Keller, celebrity chef
 Lon Kruger, professional basketball coach
 Holly Madison, reality television star
 Gavin Maloof, entrepreneur and businessman
 Floyd Mayweather Jr., professional boxer
 Conor McGregor, professional MMA fighter
 Anthony Marnell III, entrepreneur 
 Marvin Menzies, UNLV basketball coach
 Brent Musburger, sportscaster
 Kevin Na, professional golfer
 Mark O'Meara, professional golfer
 Shaquille O’Neal, professional basketball player
 Joseph Otting, businessman
 George Parros, professional hockey player
 Norman Powell, professional basketball player
 Rudy Ruettiger, motivational speaker and Notre Dame football player
 Sig Rogich, businessman
 Rob Roy, CEO of Switch
 Anthony Simmons, professional football player
 Mark Stone, professional ice hockey player 
 Dennis Swanson, CEO of Lamps Plus
 Frank Thomas, professional baseball player
 Hans-Peter Wild, billionaire businessman and lawyer
 Elaine Wynn, philanthropist and businesswoman

References

External links 
Official website
 

Las Vegas Valley
Planned communities in Clark County, Nevada